Ruined castle may refer to:

 The ruins of a castle
 Ruined Castle (rock formation), a geographical feature in Australia

See also

 
 :Category: Ruined castles
 Burgstall, the ground level ruins of a castle